Otorowo  is a village in the administrative district of Gmina Solec Kujawski, within Bydgoszcz County, Kuyavian-Pomeranian Voivodeship, in north-central Poland. It is located in the historic region of Kuyavia.

The village has a population of 250.

History

The earliest mention of the village comes from 1280, when it was part of Piast-ruled Poland.

During the German occupation (World War II), in October and November 1939, Otorowo was the site of large massacres of hundreds of Poles from Otorowo and other nearby villages, carried out by the German Einsatzkommando 16 as part of the Intelligenzaktion. In 1944, the Germans burned the bodies to cover up the crime.

References

Populated places on the Vistula
Villages in Bydgoszcz County
Massacres of Poles
Nazi war crimes in Poland